Mount Gillmor is a largely ice-free mountain (2,185 m) at the south side of the head of Svendsen Glacier, in the Usarp Mountains.

Mapped by United States Geological Survey (USGS) from surveys and U.S. Navy aerial photographs, 1960–62. Named by Advisory Committee on Antarctic Names (US-ACAN) for C. Stewart Gillmor, U.S. exchange scientist (ionospheric physics) at the Soviet Mirny Station in 1961.

References

Mountains of Oates Land